Woodgrove is a historic home located near Round Hill, Loudoun County, Virginia. The original section of the house was built around 1785, with a rear ell added around 1840, and an addition with a new main entrance in about 1910. All sections are two-and-a-half stories in height and constructed of native fieldstone. The oldest section of the house is in the Federal style and the 1910 addition is in the Classical Revival style. Also on the property is a contributing fieldstone meat house, built around 1840.

It was listed on the National Register of Historic Places in 2002.

References

Houses on the National Register of Historic Places in Virginia
Federal architecture in Virginia
Neoclassical architecture in Virginia
Houses completed in 1785
Houses in Loudoun County, Virginia
National Register of Historic Places in Loudoun County, Virginia